Tobi 8 - Coptic Calendar - Tobi 10 

The ninth day of the Coptic month of Tobi, the fifth month of the Coptic year. On a common year, this day corresponds to January 4, of the Julian Calendar, and January 17, of the Gregorian Calendar. This day falls in the Coptic season of Peret, the season of emergence.

Commemorations

Saints 

 The departure of Saint Abraam, the Friend of Abba Gawarga 
 The departure of Saint Abba Phees

References 

Days of the Coptic calendar